Kingston Presbyterian Church can refer to 

 Kingston Presbyterian Church (Kingston, New Jersey), a church in Kingston, New Jersey
 Kingston Presbyterian Church (Conway, South Carolina). a NRHP in South Carolina